The 1924 Cornell Big Red football team was an American football team that represented Cornell University during the 1924 college football season.  In their fifth season under head coach Gil Dobie, the Big Red compiled a 4–4 record and outscored all opponents by a combined total of 209 to 71.

Schedule

References

Cornell
Cornell Big Red football seasons
Cornell Big Red football